Nylanderia taylori is a species of Formicinae ant found in Bangladesh, India and Sri Lanka.

Subspecies
 Nylanderia taylori levis Forel, 1913 - Sri Lanka
 Nylanderia taylori taylori Forel, 1894 - India, Bangladesh

External links

 at antwiki.org

Formicinae
Hymenoptera of Asia
Insects described in 1894